Qyntel Deon Woods (born February 16, 1981) is an American former professional basketball player. He played mainly at the small forward position, but he also played at the shooting guard position, on occasion.

Early life and college career
Woods was born in Memphis, and grew up in the Mallory Heights neighborhood. After attending Carver High School, he spent one season of college basketball each at Moberly Area Community College and Northeast Mississippi Community College. Coming out of college, Woods was known to pro scouts as a player with exceptional potential (and was sometimes compared to Tracy McGrady), but with a history of off-court problems. He was an early entry candidate in the 2002 NBA Draft, and he had committed to play at the University of Memphis, before making himself available for draft selection.

Professional career

NBA
Woods was selected by the NBA's Portland Trail Blazers, with the 21st pick of the 2002 NBA draft. In his first two seasons with the Trail Blazers, Woods played in 115 games (53 and 62 respectively), averaging 2.4 and 3.6 points per game, and appearing sparingly in the 2003 postseason. The 2004–05 season was packed with off-court trouble for Woods, as he was charged with animal cruelty, following an investigation. He pleaded guilty to first-degree animal abuse, for staging dog fights in his house, some involving his pit bull named Hollywood. Both Hollywood and Woods' other pit bull, Sugar, were confiscated, and Woods was given 80 hours of community service, and he also agreed to donate $10,000 to the Oregon Humane Society.

In response to these events, the Trail Blazers suspended and eventually released Woods, in a settlement that involved pay withheld from Woods in 2004–05, when he was supposed to be paid $1.1 million for the third year of a three-year contract. The Trail Blazers kept about $500,000, said spokesman Art Sasse. Upon finally leaving Portland in January 2005, Woods subsequently joined the Miami Heat. He played with them in three regular season games (with averages of 3.3 points and 2 rebounds per game), but he was not used in the playoffs. He was part of a 13-player mega deal that sent him to the Boston Celtics, on August 2, 2005. He ended up being waived by the Celtics, after having played in only three exhibition games with the team, and he was subsequently signed by the New York Knicks, on December 6, 2005.

Woods' final NBA game was on April 19, 2006 in a 90 - 83 win over the New Jersey Nets where he recorded 2 points, 6 rebounds, 1 assist and 1 steal.

He played more under then Knicks head coach Larry Brown, starting sixteen games and averaging career highs in minutes per game, field goal percentage, points per game, rebounds, and assists. However, he was not kept for the following season, and he would end up playing a month (from February to March) in the NBA Development League, with the Bakersfield Jam.

Europe
Woods signed a two-year contract with Greek Basket League team Olympiacos on July 16, 2007. In 10 appearances in the Greek League regular season, he averaged 12.5 points per game in 26.3 minutes per game. In the Greek League's 2007–08 playoffs, his numbers went down (8.1 points, 2.1 rebounds, in 20.7 minutes per game).

Woods was caught using marijuana during the Greek League finals, and thus committed a breach of his contract, which led to Olympiacos terminating the final year of his deal. Subsequently, he signed with the Italian league's Fortitudo Pallacanestro Bologna, after being released by Olympiacos.

Woods played with Asseco Prokom Gdynia in Poland, where he contributed to their seventh straight Polish national league championship. Wood played a leading role in Asseco's run to the EuroLeague's Top 8 in the 2009–10 season. In the same season, he was awarded the Polish League MVP award.

In November 2010, Woods signed a one-year contract with the Russian club Krasnye Krylya Samara, but he was waived in December. because of an unsatisfactory performance. On January 30, 2011, he returned to play with Asseco Prokom Gdynia, with whom he had the best years of his career in Europe. In the summer of 2011, he signed with the Israeli squad Maccabi Haifa. One year later, he signed  with Lagun Aro GBC of Spain.

On July 8, 2013, Woods signed with the French club Le Mans Sarthe Basket. On September 5, 2013, he left Le Mans, after he failed to pass the team's physical, due to a knee injury. In August, 2014 Woods signed with AZS Koszalin, of the Polish Basketball League. On July 16, 2015, Woods signed with the French club Cholet Basket. On October 15, 2017, Woods signed with AZS Koszalin, returning to the club for a second stint.

Career statistics

Domestic leagues

References

External links
FIBA.com Profile
Euroleague.net Profile
Profile at Eurobasket.com

1981 births
Living people
21st-century American criminals
African-American basketball players
American expatriate basketball people in France
American expatriate basketball people in Greece
American expatriate basketball people in Italy
American expatriate basketball people in Israel
American expatriate basketball people in Poland
American expatriate basketball people in Russia
American expatriate basketball people in Spain
American expatriate basketball people in Ukraine
American male criminals
American men's basketball players
American people convicted of cruelty to animals
American sportspeople convicted of crimes
Asseco Gdynia players
AZS Koszalin players
Bakersfield Jam players
Basketball players from Memphis, Tennessee
BC Dnipro players
BC Krasnye Krylia players
Big3 players
Cholet Basket players
Fortitudo Pallacanestro Bologna players
Gipuzkoa Basket players
Greek Basket League players
Liga ACB players
Maccabi Haifa B.C. players
Miami Heat players
Moberly Greyhounds men's basketball players
New York Knicks players
Northeast Mississippi Tigers basketball players
Olympiacos B.C. players
Portland Trail Blazers draft picks
Portland Trail Blazers players
Small forwards
21st-century African-American sportspeople
20th-century African-American people
American men's 3x3 basketball players